Mother Mother is a 2014 Taiwanese television film. Starring Ruby Lin alongside Kao Ying Hsuan, it is the 2nd television film produced by Lin. 
It first aired on the Public Television Service (PTS) on 31 May 2014.

Plot
Yu Rou (Ruby Lin), a struggling mother who takes extreme measures in ensuring her daughter Xiao Hong (Ni Ni), who is diagnosed with Bardet–Biedl syndrome, to have good health. While working as a part-time taxi driver, Yu Rou eavesdrops on a conversation about the easy life of a rich man's mistress and decides to seduce the rich-but-impotent Jin Xiao Jie (Edison Huang)...

Cast
 Ruby Lin as Xia Yu Rou
 Kao Ying-Hsuan as Zhuang Kai Xiang
 Queenie Tai as Zhu Pin Tang
  as Jin Xiao Jie
 Ni Ni as Xiao Hong
 Stephanie Chang as Jin Dong's Wife

Production
Mother Mother received a  subvention from the Bureau of Audiovisual and Music Industry Development of Taiwan.
Production on the film started from February 19 and ended on March 5, 2014. 
This Television film is produced and aiming for the upcoming Taiwan Golden Bell Awards.

References

External links
  official site on PTS

2014 television films
2014 films
2010s Mandarin-language films
Chinese drama films
2014 romantic drama films
Taiwanese romantic drama films